Windy City Rehab is an American television series on HGTV. It stars Alison Victoria, an interior designer who does home renovation projects in Chicago, Illinois, with contractor Donovan Eckhardt (season one and the early part of season 2).  Unlike many HGTV programs, the projects are all city-based, including town homes and apartments. Many of the houses are more than 100 years old, and some are designated as landmarked buildings, adding challenges to the design and construction work. An 11-episode first season premiered on Jan 1, 2019. Production of a second season was delayed when the show's producer contracted coronavirus, and was broadcast in 2021. A third season began broadcasting in April 2022.

In each episode, a candidate house is visited by Alison and Donovan, who discuss its potential for redesign and resale value (houses are purchased without a client in mind). After purchase and development of a design plan, the duo engage in demolition work, during which unanticipated construction problems frequently emerge which add to the construction cost and schedule. The episode alternates between scenes of the construction work and scenes of Alison sourcing and purchasing salvaged furniture and decorative components (appropriate to the historical period of the house). Once construction is completed, the house is staged and prospective buyers are invited to visit to see the renovated interior and exterior.

On August 18, 2020, it was announced that the second season would premiere on September 15, 2020. Six episodes were broadcast between September 15, 2020 and October 20, 2020. In addition to focusing on home renovation projects, the season dealt with the break-up of Alison and Donovan's business over a dispute on contractor expenses.

On March 28, 2022, a third season was announced. The season began broadcasting on April 21, 2022. In addition to Chicago projects, Alison decided to travel to Los Angeles for work projects.

Alison Victoria and Donovan Eckhardt along with their companies and contractors were sued for shoddy work in relation to two homes rehabbed on the show.

Episodes

References

2010s American reality television series
2019 American television series debuts
2020s American reality television series
HGTV original programming
Television shows set in Chicago